is a Japanese politician and member of the House of Councillors for the Japanese Communist Party. Since the congress in 2000 he is also Secretary General for the party.

1942 births
Living people
Members of the House of Councillors (Japan)
Japanese Communist Party politicians
Ritsumeikan University alumni